Skybolt is a single stage space rocket designed and assembled by Starchaser Industries. It functions effectively as a scale model of Starchaser Industries' proposed Space Tourism Vehicle, "Thunderstar".  Designed and built over 7 months and unveiled in 2006, Skybolt has yet to perform a full-scale test launch. Since 2007, Skybolt has been fitted to a custom mobile platform and tours the country with Starchaser's Educational Outreach Team.

History

The original development of Skybolt was to serve a dual purpose; To field test a new engine and to further the development of the "Thunderstar" tourism rocket project.  Between 2002 and 2004 Starchaser had been working on a series of liquid propellant engine designs, all dubbed Churchill and in 2004 when the Churchill MkIII was completed and operational, there became a need to adapt the design into a practical engine that could be used within a rocket system. The new engine that was to be designed and build became the Storm engine.  Accompanying this decision to produce a new engine came the issue of what rocket to install it into, with all of Starchaser's other rockets unsuitable or requiring massive alterations. So the decision was made to design a new rocket system from the ground up to full realise Storm's potential.

Skybolt was officially unveiled on 28 September 2006  at the University of Salford and was billed to be the first British space launch since 1971.  It toured around the country alongside another of Starchaser's rockets, NOVA 1 to promote the company. As of 2011, Skybolt has yet to be fired in a full-scale test.  The Storm engine has test fired on two separate occasions, however issues with the design are holding back a launch schedule.

Propulsion
Skybolt is a single stage ballistic rocket system powered by one Storm engine with a potential to generate an average trust of 68 kN, or around 7 tonnes.  Storm utilises a bi-liquid combination of Liquid Oxygen (LOX) and Kerosene, and is effectively a practical, rocket-mountable successor to the Churchill engines developed before it. Though never flown, it is predicted that Skybolt with a fully fuelled Storm engine could reach the limit of space and beyond, and reach a top speed of nearly Mach 5.  Practically, however, Storm is still not completely ready for field testing. There have been problems with the fuel injection plate amongst other smaller issues, and until these are resolved it will be unlikely that Skybolt will fly.

Capabilities
The rocket was envisioned as a sounding rocket in preparation for Starchaser's ultimate goal, Thunderstar.  In this respect, the design had to allow for acceleration speeds that organisms can tolerate, as other Starchaser rockets have ignored this factor.  The thrust that is generated from Skybolt's engine allows for acceleration forces at around 6-7G. This is within the limits of what humans can reasonably tolerate and so was essential if this new rocket is to be the fore-runner to a bigger, manned rocket. It will take Skybolt approximately five and a half minutes to go from launch pad  to the 100 km (62mile) Edge of space, and continuing upwards to a maximum apogee of 83.52 miles. Skybolt is fully reusable, with both the airframe and nosecone containing parachutes for safe landing and recovery. A maximum payload capacity of 20 kg is limited, however as it is not intended for commercial use, this is not an issue.

Current Use
Due to the ongoing problems associated with the engine, Skybolt is used in Starchaser's educational outreach program.  Starchaser built a mobile launch rail specifically for Skybolt, allowing for transportation to and from events.

See also
Starchaser Industries
X Prize
UK Space Agency

References

External links 
 www.starchaser.co.uk
 www.space4schools.co.uk

Single-stage-to-orbit
Space launch vehicles of the United Kingdom
Cancelled space launch vehicles
Space programme of the United Kingdom